John Dean Collum (June 21, 1927 – August 29, 2009) was a pitcher in Major League Baseball (MLB) who played for eight different teams between the 1951 and 1962 seasons. He was born in Victor, Iowa.

Collum was one of four children of John Edward Collum and Sophia Louise Lohman and the youngest of three brothers. He was raised in Newburg, Iowa, near Grinnell, and graduated from Newburg High School, where he played in the Iowa State Baseball Tournament. 

Collum served in World War II with the United States Army Air Forces in the Pacific Theatre of Operations, where he was stationed in the Philippines. Following the war he returned home and married Betty Belles on February 28, 1948. He pursued his major league dreams after going 24–2 in 1948 for Class-A St. Joseph team of the Western League.

Basically a reliever, Collum also served in starting roles. He entered the major leagues in 1951 with the St. Louis Cardinals, playing for them until the 1953 midseason before joining the Cincinnati Redlegs from 1953 to 1955. After spending two years out of baseball, he rejoined the Cardinals in 1956 and also pitched with the Chicago Cubs in 1957 and for two Dodgers teams; in 1957, when they were leaving Brooklyn for the sunny skies of Los Angeles starting the 1958 season.

Collum's most productive season came with Cincinnati in 1955, when he recorded career-numbers in wins (9), earned run average (3.63) and complete games (5), while pitching 134 innings. 

Collum also had stints with the Minnesota Twins and Cleveland Indians in 1962, his last major league season.

In a nine-season career, Collum posted a 32–28 record with a 4.15 ERA in 171 appearances, including 37 starts, 11 complete games, two shutouts, 12 saves, 171 strikeouts and 173 walks in 464 innings of work.

Collum also helped himself with the bat, hitting for a .246 average (29-for-118) with one home run, 15 runs, 13 RBI, five doubles, and a .321 on-base percentage.

Following his baseball career, Collum worked in the automotive business in Grinnell, Iowa, and was owner of Grinnel Pioneer Oil. He was  inducted into the Iowa Baseball Hall of Fame and was also a member of the Major League Baseball Alumni Association and the Grinnell Eagles Lodge.

Collum died in the Mayflower Health Care Center in Grinnell at the age of 82. He was buried at Rock Creek Cemetery of Grinnell.

References

External links

1927 births
2009 deaths
People from Victor, Iowa
Baseball players from Iowa
Brooklyn Dodgers players
Chicago Cubs players
Cleveland Indians players
Cincinnati Redlegs players
Cincinnati Reds players
Los Angeles Dodgers players
Minnesota Twins players
St. Louis Cardinals players
Major League Baseball pitchers
United States Army Air Forces personnel of World War II
St. Joseph Cardinals players
Omaha Cardinals players
Rochester Red Wings players
Montreal Royals players
St. Paul Saints (AA) players
Syracuse Chiefs players
Vancouver Mounties players
Military personnel from Iowa